The .338 Winchester Magnum is a  caliber, belted, rimless, bottlenecked cartridge introduced in 1958 by Winchester Repeating Arms. It is based on the blown-out, shortened .375 H&H Magnum. The  is the caliber at which medium-bore cartridges are considered to begin. The .338 Winchester Magnum is the first choice among professional brown bear (specifically grizzly bear) guides in Alaska to back up clients where a powerful stopping caliber is required on charging bears. It is also the most popular medium-bore cartridge in North America and has the most widely available choice in rifles among medium bore rifles. The action length is the same as a .30-06, and most major rifle manufacturers in the United States chamber rifles for the cartridge including the semi-automatic Browning BAR Mk II Safari, making it a very powerful combination against charging dangerous game. The cartridge was intended for larger North American big-game species and has found use as for the hunting of thin-skinned African plains-game species.

Cartridge history
The .338 Winchester Magnum traces its heritage to the experiments conducted by Charles O'Neil, Elmer Keith and Don Hopkins with cartridges firing  bullets in the late 1940s. The use of  bullets may seem odd today but at the time this was the standard diameter of European .33 caliber bullets which were more common than the  diameter bullets used in cartridges such as the .33 Winchester. O'Neil, Keith and Hopkins experiments led to the creation of the .333 OKH, which was based on the .30-06 Springfield case necked up to accept .33 caliber bullets and the .334 OKH which used a shortened .375 H&H Magnum necked down to accept the same bullets.

Sometime later, Winchester introduced the Winchester Model 70 Alaskan chambered for the cartridge. This chambering left little doubt that the cartridge was intended for big heavy dangerous game.

Design and specifications
The .338 Winchester Magnum follows the modern cartridge designs in that the cartridge case features a case with minimal taper so as to maximize case capacity yet providing reliable feeding and extraction. The case has a capacity of 86.0 grain of H2O (5.58 cm3). The cartridge follows the design of the standard length Weatherby Magnum cartridges such as the .257 Weatherby Magnum, .270 Weatherby Magnum and the 7 mm Weatherby Magnum for which Winchester had supplied basic brass until 1948.

Both the Commission Internationale Permanente pour l'Epreuve des Armes à Feu Portatives(CIP) and the Sporting Arms and Ammunition Manufacturers' Institute (SAAMI) govern and regulate the specifications regarding the .338 Winchester Magnum.

The CIP enforces a  pressure limit for the cartridge.

Performance
Bullets are available in a very wide range of designs and weights ranging from 150 to 300 grains. SAAMI pressure level is 64,000 psi.

The .338 Winchester Magnum is capable of launching heavier bullets than the .30 caliber (7.62mm) cartridges. This is approximately 25% more energy generated than the 30-06 Springfield.

Hornady's  SST Superformance load has muzzle energy of  @ 3030fps. It maintains  @ 2068fps @ 500 meters. Hornady's  SST Superformance load has muzzle energy of  @ 2840fps. It maintains  @ 2014fps @ 500 meters. This is from a 24" test barrel as compared to 27.5" test barrel for a 338 Lapua. Figures would be higher if shot from a 27.5" test barrel but still over 150fps slower than a 338 Lapua if tested with the same length barrel.

This is about twice as much as the recoil from an average .308 Winchester. Strong recoil like this can be mitigated with the use of properly designed stocks and recoil pads. By comparison, this cartridge has less recoil than other more powerful .338-caliber rifles such as the .338 RUM, .340 Weatherby and .338 Lapua.

Sporting usage
This is due in part to the bullet technology available today. Lighter bullets made today are able to hold together and penetrate deeper than heavier bullets of the past.

In North America, the .338 Winchester Magnum is most commonly used for the hunting of larger deer species such as elk and moose. It is quite popular with elk hunters, with bullets ranging between  generally preferred for large class 3 game such as elk or moose.

Apart from the larger deer species, the .338 Winchester Magnum is often used for the hunting of and defense against dangerous class 3 game, particularly the great bears including grizzly, polar and brown bears. It is often carried by fishermen, hunters and guides in Alaska and Canada for protection as encounters with these larger bear species can be common.

The .338 Winchester Magnum can be considered a good all-round plains game hunting rifle in Africa. It has also been found to be effective against the big cats where hunting allows for the use of the cartridge.

Rifles and ammunition
Due to the cartridge's popularity all North American rifle manufacturers offer rifles chambered in the .338 Winchester Magnum. Ruger, Browning, Kimber, Remington, Savage, Weatherby, Mossberg, Howa and Winchester chamber the cartridge in several product lines. Almost all custom rifle makers in the United States and Canada produce .338 Winchester rifles. In European rifle makers Blaser, Mauser, Sako and Tikka also manufacture rifles for this cartridge. The large number of rifle choices available in the .338 Winchester Magnum offers the rifleman a greater choice in available rifles.

All North American ammunition makers offer several loadings of the .338 Winchester Magnum to the public for sale. At this point in time Federal has six in their Vital-Shok and Fusion ammunition lines, Hornady has five, including four in their Superformance ammunition which is putting an end to the light magnum and heavy magnum line of ammo but adds up to  more without added recoil or muzzle blast. The 185 gr. Remington and Winchester offer four loadings each for the cartridge. Several smaller ammunition including Cor-Bon and Double Tap also manufacture loaded ammunition.

See also
 8 mm caliber
 List of rifle cartridges
 Sectional density
 Table of handgun and rifle cartridges

References

External links 
 

Pistol and rifle cartridges
Winchester Magnum rifle cartridges